Doomwatch  is a 1972 British science fiction film directed by Peter Sasdy and starring Ian Bannen, Judy Geeson and John Paul. Described as both a thriller  and a horror film, it is based on the BBC's science fiction television series Doomwatch which ran between 1970 and 1972. The screenplay was written by Clive Exton. In the United States it was released by Embassy Pictures with the alternative title Island of the Ghouls.

In the film, the waters surrounding an island become contaminated by chemical dumping, and people who eat fish caught in those waters become deformed and violent.

Plot
An outsider visits a remote isolated village that has seemingly shunned the modern life. Doctor Del Shaw, an investigator from the British ecological watchdog group nicknamed Doomwatch, is sent to the island of Balfe, to file a report on the effects of a recent oil tanker spill. He becomes fascinated with the mysterious behavioural disorders of the locals who display rudeness and random aggression and a strange genetic prevalence of thick lips and sloping brows. Investigation shows that the villagers have been suffering over a prolonged period from hormonal disorders, which are being caused by leaking drums of growth stimulants that have been dumped offshore. The islanders have been eating contaminated fish and develop a disorder of excessive hormonal growth, which produces aggression and eventually madness, attributed to a form of acromegaly.  Rather than seek help from the mainland they hide those who are deformed from any newcomers.

Cast
 Ian Bannen as Dr. Del Shaw
 Judy Geeson as Victoria Brown
 John Paul as Dr. Spencer Quist
 Simon Oates as Dr. John Ridge
 Jean Trend as Dr. Fay Chantry
 Joby Blanshard as Colin Bradley
 George Sanders as The Admiral
 Percy Herbert as PC Hartwell
 Shelagh Fraser as Mrs. Betty Straker
 Geoffrey Keen as Sir Henry Leyton
 Joseph O'Conor as Vicar
 Norman Bird as Brewer
 Constance Chapman as Miss Johnson
 Michael Brennan as Tom Straker
 James Cosmo as Bob Gillette

Production
The sets were designed by the art director Colin Grimes.

Filming
The film was made at Pinewood Studios and location shooting took place around Polkerris, Mevagissey and Polperro and Chapel Porth in Cornwall, as well as the London Heliport in Battersea.

Critical reception
For Radio Times, Tom Hutchinson awarded the film two stars out of five, writing "this mystery thriller crash-landed unhappily in the swamp of horror instead of on the firmer ground of science fact or fiction [...] It's risibly alarmist, certainly, but the environmental dangers it pinpoints are only too topical." Halliwell's Film Guide described it as "an unsatisfactory horror film".

References

External links
 https://www.imdb.com/title/tt0068498/
 Doomwatch film locations www.reelstreets.com

1972 films
1970s science fiction thriller films
British science fiction horror films
British science fiction thriller films
Folk horror films
Films directed by Peter Sasdy
Films shot at Pinewood Studios
Films scored by John Scott (composer)
Films set on fictional islands
Films set in Cornwall
Films shot in Cornwall
Films set in London
Films shot in London
Films with screenplays by Clive Exton
1970s English-language films
1970s British films